Haven is a 2004 feature film set in the Cayman Islands, a British offshore financial centre. The film premiered at the Toronto International Film Festival in 2004. It is written and directed by native Caymanian Frank E. Flowers and filmed entirely in the  West Indian dependency.

Haven is an ensemble film in which unconnected lives intersect and result in a violent chain of events that turns tranquility into chaos. It was released in limited theaters in the United States on September 15, 2006.

The film's tagline was "Can love survive the fall of paradise?"

Plot
A corrupt and greedy businessman, Carl Ridley (Bill Paxton), is running from the government, with his 18-year-old daughter Pippa (Agnes Bruckner) in tow. Pippa is not happy to leave her friends and comfortable life in Miami for the Cayman Islands.

Arriving in the islands, Ridley is preoccupied. Banks are rapidly closing and he must find a clean place to store his stolen money. Meanwhile, Pippa finds native Caymanian Fritz (Victor Rasuk) sleeping off a late night in her bed. He flees out the window, leaving his wallet behind. She later finds Fritz on the beach to return his wallet and befriends him, in spite of his ridiculous come-on attempts.

Fritz is yearning to show her the island, including its wild parties. But he owes money to island gang leader Richie Ritch (Raz Adoti), and when he peeks in on Pippa's father unwrapping a massive amount of cash that he had taped around his torso, Fritz begins scheming. Pippa is completely unaware that she's leading her father into even more trouble than he had in the United States.

A parallel storyline involves Shy (Orlando Bloom), a Cayman native. He is in love with Andrea (Zoë Saldaña), the daughter of his boss, Mr. Sterling, a very influential person in the island. But for an unknown reason, Andrea's brother Hammer (Anthony Mackie) despises Shy. To protect their secret affair, whenever Shy would visit Andrea at home his good friend Kimo (Mpho Koaho) would watch the house in case Andrea's father were to arrive. On Andrea's birthday Shy visits her house and has sex with her, but Kimo falls asleep and fails to warn Shy of Sterling's arrival. Shy escapes out the window, but not without being identified by Hammer. Later on, to avenge his sister's lost womanhood, Hammer attacks Shy with acid which leaves a permanent scar on Shy's face. Hammer is sent to jail for four months.

Physically and emotionally scarred, Shy becomes a recluse. Andrea is emotionally broken and gives in to drugs and sex. Shy has his friend Patrick, the son of Mr. Allen (Ridley's lawyer), take him to Richie's birthday party to find Andrea. Finding her in the bathroom having sex with a stranger, he runs into the front yard and vomits. She runs after him but he pushes her away knowing that she is high. Hammer sees Shy and begins to beat him up with help from his friends. Shy finally breaks free and runs down the street as Hammer curses at him, telling him to stay away.

Meanwhile, at the same party, Fritz gets pulled in to see Richie while Pippa talks to a few other white girls doing drugs. Upset after smoking some pot, she finds Fritz and demands that he take her home. Having just told Richie to go to her home to steal the cash, he instead takes her to Mr. Sterling's yacht. As they sit down inside, they find that the alarm has been set off; the police arrive shortly and arrest both of them. Pippa is taken to the police station, while Fritz is transported to a laundromat where a local cop who knows him delivers a lecture and a beating for acting disobediently throughout his life.

After his own beating, Shy obtains a gun and returns to the party to find Hammer. After firing the gun to clear out the party, he corners Hammer and explains what a mess Hammer has made of his own sister's life. He says that he will spare Hammer's life so that he can watch the trouble that he has caused in Andrea's life. Hammer replies that he would rather see Andrea become a whore than be with Shy. Enraged, Shy pulls the trigger. Shocked by what he has done, he apologizes and runs off.

Over the next few hours, Andrea asks Patrick to take her to find Shy. He is disgusted with her and kicks her out of his car, but tells her that Shy is at the docks. When she finds him, she expresses her desire to be with him, regardless of others' feelings. When he confesses to killing her brother, however, she leaves him in disgust, forgetting her shoes in her hurry.

When Allen and Ridley go to the police station the next morning, Ridley soon realizes that he has been betrayed and is taken into custody by the FBI. When Allen goes home to retrieve the money that he believes he tricked Ridley into leaving in his safe, he discovers that the bag contains only sand and a conch shell. At her own condo, Pippa discovers the million dollars under her mattress.

In the final scenes, Andrea prepares for Hammer's funeral with her father, Kimo comforts Shy's mother, and Shy sits on the dock where Andrea left him. He then gets into his boat, cuts the rope and motors away, throwing the gun into the water.

Cast
 Orlando Bloom as "Shy"
 Zoë Saldaña as Andrea
 Victor Rasuk as Fritz
 Bill Paxton as Carl Ridley
 Stephen Dillane as Mr. Allen
 Razaaq Adoti as Richie Rich
 Agnes Bruckner as Pippa Ridley
 Joy Bryant as Sheila
 Bobby Cannavale as Lieutenant
 Robert Wisdom as Mr. Sterling
 Lee Ingleby as Patrick
 Anthony Mackie as "Hammer"
 Sarah Carter as Chanel
 Ky-Mani Marley as John "The Baptist"
 Jake Weber as Officer Powell
 Mpho Koaho as Kimo
 Santiago Cabrera as Gene
 Rachel Miner as Eva
 Peter O'Meara as Officer Franklin
 Serena Scott Thomas as Mrs. Allen

References

External links

Interview: Orlando Bloom & Zoe Saldana Haven
Watch Orlando Bloom and Frank E. Flowers at IndependentFilm.com

2004 films
2004 crime drama films
American crime drama films
American nonlinear narrative films
Films set in the Cayman Islands
Films shot in the Cayman Islands
Films scored by Heitor Pereira
2006 drama films
2006 films
2000s English-language films
2000s American films